The East and West Coast Railway was a railroad line running from Bradenton on the west coast of Florida southeast to Arcadia in the Peace River valley.  Despite its name, the line never went all the way to the east coast of Florida.  The line was often used to transport mail, lumber, grain and other commodities.

Opened on May 3, 1915, the nearly fifty mile line began at the Seaboard Air Line Railroad's line through Bradenton just south of the Manatee River, and ran southeast closely following the current route of State Road 70 via Myakka City to Arcadia.  In Arcadia, the line crossed the Charlotte Harbor and Northern Railway and the Atlantic Coast Line Railroad's Lakeland–Fort Myers Line before terminating in the southeast portion of Arcadia.  

In 1925, the Seaboard Air Line Railroad leased the entire line, who had provided locomotives and rolling stock for the line since its construction.  A year later, Seaboard also purchased the Charlotte Harbor and Northern Railway.  As a result, Seaboard used the East and West Coast Railway less frequently to the point where the line was completely removed in 1934.

The East and West Coast Railway was one of two railroad lines running from the Bradenton area to the Peace River valley.  The other was the southern extension of the Atlantic Coast Line's Tampa Southern Railroad which ran from Sarasota to Southfort (near Fort Ogden) in a parallel trajectory to the East and West Coast Railway.

Station listing

References

Defunct Florida railroads
Predecessors of the Seaboard Air Line Railroad
Railway companies established in 1915
Railway companies disestablished in 1925
American companies established in 1915
1915 establishments in Florida
1925 disestablishments in Florida